Bowling and Barkerend is an electoral ward within the City of Bradford Metropolitan District Council. The population at the 2011 Census was 20,618.

Bowling and Barkerend covers the area immediately east and south of Bradford centre. It includes the areas known as Barkerend, Bowling, East Bowling, Swaine Green, Cutler Heights and Goose Hill. St Clement's Church on Barkerend Road has Pre-Raphaelite decorations by Sir Edward Burne-Jones. Note that West Bowling is in neighbouring Little Horton ward.

Boundaries 
It is bounded on the west side by the Bradford Inner Ring Road (Canal Road, Shipley Airedale Road, Croft Street) then the railway line from Bradford Interchange to Halifax until it meets New Cross Street where the boundary heads south east around the edge of Parkside (New Cross Street, Avenue Road, Parkside Road and along the edge of the Cemetery). On the south side the boundary follows the Outer Ring Road (Rooley Lane, Sticker Lane) past Wakefield Road then forks east on Cutler Heights Lane which becomes Dick Lane as it curves northward. The boundary then follows the Bradford to Leeds railway line west. The boundary heads north again along Birksland Street and continues the same line between Gledhill Road and Whitehead Street, through the grounds of Leeds Road Hospital and along the edge of the allotments to Barkerend Road. Then north east along the path marking the edge of Bradford Moor Golf Course to re-join the Outer Ring Road (Killinghall Road). Along the north side the boundary forks west off Killinghall Road onto Northcote Road then turns west along Otley Road. The boundary loops south round Undercliffe Cemetery and back to Otley Road, as the road turns south the boundary continues west along the edge of the school fields to Bolton Road and continues west down the hill to Canal Road as it feeds into the inner ring road.

Councillors
Bowling and Barkerend ward is represented on Bradford Council by three Labour Party councillors, Rizwana Jamil, Imran Khan and Hassan Khan.

 indicates seat up for re-election.
 Incumbent Rupert Oliver switched from the Lib Dems to Labour in October 2006.

Elections in 2010s

May 2016

May 2015 
In the 2015 election one of the three councillor posts was up for re-election. Imran Ahmed Khan for the Labour Party was the incumbent. The election was held in conjunction with the 2015 UK general election. Turnout is often increased in local elections when held in conjunction with general elections.

May 2014 
In the 2014 election one of the three councillor posts was up for re-election. Zafir Hussain Shah for the Conservative Party was the incumbent. The percentage changes are calculated in comparison to the 2012 election.

May 2012 
In the 2012 election one of the three councillor posts was up for re-election. John Anthony Robertshaw for the Conservative Party was the incumbent. The percentage changes are calculated in comparison to the party performances in the 2011 election.

May 2011 
In the 2011 election one of the three councillor posts was up for re-election. Mohammed Jamil for the Conservative Party was the incumbent. The percentage changes are calculated compared to the party performances in the 2010 election.

May 2010 
In the 2010 election one of the three councillor posts was up for re-election. Zameer Shah for the Conservative Party was the incumbent. The percentage changes are calculated compared to the party shares in the 2008 election. The election was held in conjunction with the 2010 General Election, turnout is often increased when local elections coincide with General Elections.

Elections in 2000s
2008

In the 2008 election one of the three councillor posts was up for re-election. Rupert Oliver for the Labour Party was the incumbent though he had been elected for the Liberal Democrats. The percentage changes are calculated compared to the party shares in the 2007 election.

2007
In the 2007 Election one of the three councillor posts was up for re-election. Mohammed Jamil for the Conservative Party was the incumbent. The percentage changes are calculated in comparison the party shares in the 2006 election.

In July 2006 Rupert Oliver, elected for the Liberal Democrats, resigned the Liberal Democrat whip & joined the Labour Party.

2006
In the 2006 Election only one of the three councillor posts was up for re-election. Mukhtar Ali for the Liberal Democrats was the incumbent.
The turnout does not include spoiled papers & is a percentage of the 2007 electorate.
Percentages changed are expressed compared to the overall party showings in 2004.

2004
The ward was created after boundary changes in the 2004 election. All three councillor posts were up for election and each elector had three votes. The turnout is estimated as a third of the total votes cast as a fraction of the 2007 electorate. Candidate percentages are expressed as a fraction of this turnout estimate. The election was held in conjunction with the 2004 European election.

References 

 BCSP (Internet Explorer only)
 BBC 2004 election results
 BBC 2006 election results
 Council 2007 election results
 Rupert takes seat on Labour benches
 Council ward profile
 Council 2008 election results retrieved 15 April 2010
 Council 2010 election results retrieved 7 May 2010
  retrieved 6 May 2011

Wards of Bradford